Andrea Bonito, C.O. (1619 – 2 February 1684) was a Roman Catholic prelate who served as Bishop of Capaccio (1677–1674).

Biography
Andrea Bonito was born in Amalfi, Italy in 1619 and ordained a priest in the Oratory of Saint Philip Neri.
On 14 June 1677, he was appointed during the papacy of Pope Innocent XI as Bishop of Capaccio. On 20 June 1677, he was consecrated bishop by Alessandro Crescenzi (cardinal), Bishop of Recanati e Loreto, with Carlo Vaini, Titular Archbishop of Nicaea, and Prospero Bottini, Titular Archbishop of Myra, serving as co-consecrators. He served as Bishop of Capaccio until his death on 2 February 1684.

References

External links and additional sources
 (for Chronology of Bishops) 
 (for Chronology of Bishops) 

17th-century Italian Roman Catholic bishops
Bishops appointed by Pope Innocent XI
1619 births
1684 deaths
Oratorian bishops